Baby's Day Out is a 1994 American adventure comedy film directed by Patrick Read Johnson and written by John Hughes, who also produced the film. Starring Joe Mantegna, Lara Flynn Boyle, Joe Pantoliano, and Brian Haley. The plot centers on a wealthy baby's abduction by three criminals, his subsequent escape and adventure through Chicago while being pursued by the criminals.

The film was released on July 1, 1994, by 20th Century Fox in the United States to both critical and commercial failure, grossing only $30 million against a $48 million budget. Despite this, it has since become a cult film.

Plot
Bennington Austin "Bink" Cotwell IV, the infant son of socialites Laraine and Bennington Austin "Bing" Cotwell III, lives in a mansion in a suburb of Chicago and is just about to appear in the social pages of the newspaper.

Three very clumsy criminals, Edgar "Eddie" Mauser, Norbert "Norby" LeBlaw, and Victor "Veeko" Riley, disguise themselves as baby photographers from the newspaper and kidnap him, demanding a $5 million ransom. After the kidnapping, however, the criminals have difficulty controlling Bink at their apartment. Norby attempts to put him to sleep by reading his favorite storybook, Baby's Day Out (or "Boo-boo", as he calls it), only to fall asleep himself from boredom, leaving Bink unattended. Looking through the book, Bink notices a bird on the page and then one by the window; he follows it out and successfully gets away from his kidnappers. The ensuing chase culminates in Eddie falling off the building and into a garbage bin. Norby and Veeko rescue him, and they begin pursuing Bink across the city.

The FBI arrives at the mansion, headed by Dale Grissom, where they try to piece together clues along with Bink's parents and his nanny, Gilbertine. Meanwhile, Bink, now outside on the ground and crawling about, finds another part of his book – the blue bus, which he then boards. The criminals realize he is escaping and start chasing the bus in their van, but their efforts are in vain.

Meanwhile, on the bus, Bink crawls into the bag of an obese lady who gets off at her stop shortly afterward. By the time the criminals catch the bus, they realize Bink is not on board and follow the lady, leading to an altercation after she catches them. In the distraction, Bink crawls up to a revolving door at the entrance to a department store and is forced inwards by its momentum. He is stopped by an employee who works for the store's day care center, believing he is another baby who escaped from there. He then escapes from the store and eventually crawls into traffic after a ride on a taxi.

The criminals attempt to follow him, but keep getting injured in the process as he makes his way to the city zoo. They are shocked to find him in the ape house with a western lowland gorilla, which shows a paternal side and does not injure him. The gorilla also feeds Bink with some of its fruits. The criminals try to retrieve him, but the gorilla notices them; it pounds Veeko's hand, throws Norby into the air using a mop as a catapult, and hurls Eddie against the bars of another nearby cage.

The criminals corner and catch Bink in the zoo's park, but are confronted by two chatty police officers, who have noticed that their van's engine is still running. During the conversation, Eddie hides Bink under his coat in his lap, but Bink reaches his cigarette lighter, setting his groin on fire and sneaking off as soon as the officers are gone. Veeko extinguishes the fire by stomping repeatedly on Eddie's groin.

They then follow Bink to a construction site where they experience several near-death mishaps such as Veeko getting thrown off the building and into the back of a garbage truck, Norby falling into a vat of wet cement, and Eddie getting stranded on a crane after being drenched in glue. The sun then sets as Bink and the construction crew leave the site. After managing to escape, the criminals give up on catching Bink and return home.

Bink's parents are notified of various sightings of him in the city and Gilbertine deduces that he has been following Baby's Day Out, and will most likely head for the Old Soldiers' Home next. They find him there, but on the way home, he begins to call out for his "Boo-Boo" toward the criminals' flat. The recuperating criminals, upon hearing Bink calling out for his book, realize that he has returned, and upon looking out the window, to their shock, they find themselves surrounded by the FBI, who have arrived to arrest them, and also find Bink and his parents standing outside the building as well. As Eddie berates Bink for ratting them out, Grissom forces the criminals to return Bink's book.

Back at home, Bink is put to bed by his parents, who discuss having his picture taken by a normal photographer in the morning while, unbeknownst to them, he wakes up and gets ready to read another book titled Baby's Trip to China.

Cast
 Adam Robert Worton and Jacob Joseph Worton as Bennington Austin "Bink" Cotwell IV
 Verne Troyer as Bink's stunt double.
 Joe Mantegna as Edgar "Eddie" Mauser
 Joe Pantoliano as Norbert "Norby" LeBlaw
 Brian Haley as Victor "Veeko" Riley
 Lara Flynn Boyle as Laraine Cotwell
 Matthew Glave as Bennington Austin "Bing" Cotwell III
 Cynthia Nixon as Gilbertine
 Fred Thompson as FBI Agent Dale Grissom
 John Neville as Mr. Andrews
 Robin Baber as the fat lady
 Trevor Dalton as Norm
 Eddie Bracken as Old Soldier
 Dawn Maxey as Teenage Employee
 Anna Thomson as Mrs. McCray
 John Alexander as the gorilla's in-suit performer
 Jugen Heimann, Tom Hester, Mark Setrakian, and Marc L. Taylor assisted in the gorilla's face performance
 Neil Flynn and William Homes as the cops in the park
 Mike Starr as Jojo Ducky (uncredited)

Production
Baby's Day Out was filmed in Chicago, Illinois, and Los Angeles, California on August 17 - December 16, 1993, and was featured one of the earliest fully computer-generated 3D cityscapes which was a challenge for Industrial Light and Magic. Senior digital artist Henry LaBounta said: “We had to have a CG city – Chicago – for those shots where the baby’s looking down from the crane. I was the guy that was going to be making that city. And I was like, I just started here. [Visual Effects Supervisor John Knoll]’s like, ‘Yeah, but you’re the 3D expert guy.’ That took me a little while to realize, oh, most of the people I’m working with here are more 2D compositing type people and I’m coming in on my first show as one of the experts on the team.”

Reception

Critical response
The film was panned by critics. On Rotten Tomatoes, it has a "Rotten" score of 19% based on 16 reviews with an average rating of 4.2/10. Audiences polled by CinemaScore gave the film an average grade of "A" on an A+ to F scale.

Critic Roger Ebert wrote that "Baby's Day Out contains gags that might have worked in a Baby Herman cartoon, but in live action, with real people, taxis, buses, streets, and a real baby, they're just not funny. The Worton twins are adorable as Baby Bink, however; the audience produced an audible coo the first time they saw him on the screen." He gave the film one-and-a-half stars out of four. However, his partner on the Siskel & Ebert show, Gene Siskel, liked it and called it an "absolute perfect child's-eye view of the fantasies that they might have."

Hal Hinson, writing for the Washington Post, wrote: "The pace is quick and efficient but never frantic...almost everything in the picture is just right, including the two-bit crooks who abduct the superhero toddler and end up bruised and begging hilariously for mercy. Best of all, though, is the Binkman himself, whose tiny face is so expressive that he brings new meaning to the phrase 'conquering with a smile.'"

Box office
The film opened with takings of $4,044,662 at the start of July 1994. It finally grossed $16,827,402 at the box office in the United States and Canada and $13.4 million internationally, for a worldwide total of $30.2 million, a disappointing return considering the $48 million production budget.

Year-end lists
 1st worst – Melinda Miller, The Buffalo News
 Top 10 worst (not ranked) – Dan Webster, The Spokesman-Review

Popularity in India and remakes
The film was popular in India. The owner of a large Kolkata theater told Roger Ebert in 1999 that it was the most successful film at his theater, running full for more than 17 weeks. It was remade in Telugu in 1995 under the title Sisindri, in Hindi as Ek Phool Teen Kante in 1997, the Telugu version was then remade in Malayalam in 1999 as James Bond. In Sri Lanka 2002, the Sinhalese version was titled Onna Babo.

Remakes

Cancelled video game
A video game adaptation of the film was planned, completed and slated to be released on Super Nintendo Entertainment System, Sega Genesis, and Game Boy in October 1994, but was canceled shortly before release. Instead of playing as Bink, the player would have controlled his guardian angel in order to guide him to safety in the vein of Pac-Man 2: The New Adventures. Despite its cancellation, an advertisement for the game is included on the film's VHS release. Two prototypes of the Genesis port have surfaced online in subsequent years.

Home media
20th Century Fox Home Entertainment released the film on VHS on April 4, 1995, and on DVD on January 29, 2002. Special features include Patrick Read Johnson's commentary, a featurette and a trailer for it. It was re-released on DVD on October 11, 2011.

References

External links

 
 Baby's Day Out at Rotten Tomatoes
 

1990s chase films
1990s children's comedy films
1990s crime comedy films
1994 comedy films
20th Century Fox films
American chase films
American children's comedy films
American crime comedy films
American slapstick comedy films
1990s English-language films
Films about babies
Films about child abduction in the United States
Films about criminals
Films about dysfunctional families
Films about nannies
Films directed by Patrick Read Johnson
Films produced by John Hughes (filmmaker)
Films scored by Bruce Broughton
Films set in Chicago
Films set in zoos
Films shot in Chicago
Films with screenplays by John Hughes (filmmaker)
1990s American films